Mondry or Mundry is a surname. In Poland, these are non-standard or regional forms of Mądry. Notable people with the surname include:

 Chuck Mondry (born 1968), American screenwriter
 Henrietta Mondry, New Zealand academic
 Isabel Mundry (born 1963), German composer

See also
 Eryka Mondry-Kost (born 1940), Polish gymnast
 

Polish-language surnames